Channel [V] Philippines was a 24-hour music-entertainment television network owned by STAR TV and Fox Networks Group Philippines in partnership with TV Xtreme Broadcasting Company (formerly Makisig Network) and Northern Star Productions as network provider.

History

Debut on UHF 23 
Channel V was first launched in 1994 in the Philippines, as MTV Asia made the decision to split from STAR TV and form its own satellite TV channel in Asia. It began airing on UHF Channel 23, licensed to Ermita Electronics Corporation, as the Philippines' first UHF TV station fully devoted to re-broadcasting a foreign satellite channel after MTV Asia was started as a music channel in 1992. It was started as the "Next Generation of Music" until it relaunched as Channel V. During that time, the actual feed was Channel V Chinese on AsiaSat 1 while the Asian/Indian counterparts were on AsiaSat 2 and Palapa C2, respectively.

Channel V in the Philippines aired only a few of the English-language shows like The Ride, Over The Edge, By Demand, Rewind, Asian Top 20, Billboard US Countdown and Sigaw Manila (with Filipino artists, locally produced by Probe Productions) but aired several of their Mandarin Chinese or Indian counterparts.

In the same year, the station launched the first ever Channel V Philippines VJ Hunt for aspiring Filipino VJs; it was won by Melanie Casul, the competition's first and last winner.

The channel left UHF 23 in July 1996, when EEC (the owner of the license) turned over to AMCARA Broadcasting Network, an ABS-CBN affiliate, creating Studio 23 (now known as ABS-CBN Sports+Action). The station is currently inactive since May 2020, after NTC release a cease and desist order on ABS-CBN after its franchise was relapsed.

Move to UHF 27

August 1995 
Before GMA Network officially launched Citynet Television in August 1995, GMA Network signed a contract with Star TV Network to broadcast selected taped Channel V International TV shows from 1995 until its closure in March 1999. This programming made Trey Farley, Joey Mead, Amanda Griffin, Michael Zerrudo and the late Francis Magalona former VJ-TV hosts of part-Filipino descent, familiar to Citynet viewers. From 1998 until its closure in March 1999, Asian Top 20 Countdown was the only rebroadcast Channel V show.

December 1999 
On December 15, 1999, STAR TV leased the airtime of Citynet to launch Channel V Philippines through EMC, also known as Entertainment Music Channel. Part of the strategy to localize Channel V was with programming produced both by Star TV and GMA through Alta Productions and Probe Productions, Inc. The marketing image was shifted from music to more live-action products. Idents from this time frame used the brackets in the name. It dimensionalized the name Channel V, making it into an object that could then became an environment for its broadcast design and a stage for live events. Additional shifts in programming occurred at the relaunch, specifically a shift to genre-specific rather than continuous hits, with special graphics for each set. In the middle of 2001, Channel V Philippines shut down due to the intense competition from MTV Philippines provided by Nation Broadcasting Corporation, a PLDT sister company, when PLDT bought a controlling stake of GMA Network. The channel was officially shut down on July 25, 2001.

After 17 years of inactivity, UHF 27 was resurrected again and became the new flagship channel of GMA News TV which was re-established on June 4, 2019, after GMA Network's partnership with ZOE Broadcasting Network was terminated in May 2019, it was later rebranded to GTV.

Channel V returns to the Philippines 
Eight years later, STAR TV (in turn was directly over to Fox Networks Group) and Makisig Network/Herma Group Inc (now known as TV Xtreme Broadcasting Company) announced an agreement to expand Channel V in the Philippines and to launch Tagalog-language content geared toward youth audiences, with an emphasis on local VJs, Pinoy music, and local bands and artists. Makisig now included Channel V International in its basic tier of cable channels, expanding the reach of the channel to more than 600,000 households across the Philippines. The channel's program mix is 60% Hong Kong satellite feed and 40% local feed versions of the more popular programs. Local content includes local-language and Pinoy music. The channel's creative director is Jose Javier Reyes.

Makisig continued to expand the reach of Channel V, moving it down from channel 59 to 25 on SkyCable and adding online content.

On March 26, 2011, Channel V Philippines went temporarily off-the-air after its CEO, then Ilocos Sur representative Ronald Singson, was jailed in Hong Kong for possession of illegal drugs. Its international counterpart took its place temporarily until April 25, 2011, when it returned on Destiny Cable through Northern Star Productions (owned by Chavit Singson). On July 13, 2012, Channel V Philippines had its final broadcast due to still unknown reasons, then reverted to Channel V Asia.

In 2015, Fox Networks Group's Philippine branch took over the rights on the Channel [V] Philippines branding, but this time as a sponsor for its forthcoming concerts and events and using Philippine feed for the teaser or promos to other Fox Networks Group Philippines' channels and special programming such as Fusion Music Festivals until the main feed's shutdown on October 1, 2021.

Channel V Philippines programs

Note: Some of the Channel V International programs also air on V Philippines with the V orange logo except from V Philippines produced programs only airs during night time, early morning and during commercials (V light blue logo).

Previous shows
Backtrack Pinas 
Bente Uno
Boys Night Out (also broadcast on Magic 89.9)
Circuit TV
Dyip Ni Juan
Encore
Filipino Poker Tour
Hits All You Can
In Command
The G Spot
PopKorn
Scene and Heard Philippines
Sound Reel 
V Buzz
V Life
V Scene
V Trends
V Tunes Pinas
V'd Out
V Tunes Pinas Live

Channel V Philippines executives
Luis "Chavit" Singson – Owner, Northern Star Production (Channel V Philippines)
Rommel Singson – Channel Head 
Cora Dacong – overall in charge of production
Arnel Balauro – Production Manager
Jed Velasco – Events Head, Sales/Advertising
Francis Quilantang – Production Head
Joanna Cayanan – Head Writer
Kimm Hadap – Events and Marketing Coordinator
Kerstie Sorbito – Writer
Angela Realica – Marketing
Josh Garcia – Marketing

2012
Judith Evaristo - Sales Director
Angelo Valenzuela - Sales Manager
Pam Reyes - Events and Marketing Manager
Arnel Balauro – Production Manager
Francis Quilantang – Production Head
Kerstie Sorbito – Writer
Angela Realica – Marketing Officer
Mary Joy Simeon-Sales and Marketing Officer

VJs

Previous VJs and program hosts
Cliff Ho
Megan Young
Sanya Smith 
Kevin Cisco
Trey Farley
Joey Mead
Melanie Casul
Amanda Griffin
Francis Magalona†
Mike Zerrudo
Brad Turvey
Maxine Mamba
Alvin Pulga
Georgina Wilson
Solenn Heussaff
Marc Nelson (The Bro Code)
Claudine Trillo (V Life)
JR Issac (Circuit TV)
Maike Evers (Filipino Poker Tour)
Geoff Rodriguez (Filipino Poker Tour)
Tim Yap (V Trends)
Slick Rick (Boys Night Out)
Sam Y.G. (Boys Night Out)
Tony Toni (Boys Night Out)
DJ Vince G (The G Spot)

See also
Channel V
MTV Philippines
MTV Pinoy
myx
Citynet Television

References

External links

Channel V Philippines UHF 27 Promo Video (2000)

Television networks in the Philippines
Music video networks in the Philippines
GMA Network (company) channels
Defunct television networks in the Philippines
Television channels and stations established in 1999
Television channels and stations disestablished in 2001
Television channels and stations established in 2009
Television channels and stations disestablished in 2012
1999 establishments in the Philippines